"The Ninth Skeleton" is a short story  by American writer Clark Ashton Smith. It was first published in the September 1928 issue of Weird Tales. It was his first story for Weird Tales.

Plot
The story tells of the experience of a man, Herbert, on his way to meet his girlfriend Guenevere, who experiences what seems to be a macabre vision of various skeletons, each of whom advances with a skeleton child in its arms. The ninth skeleton (of the title) has no infant skeleton, but is still in the grave, and attempts to pull the narrator in. However, he awakes to normal reality, apparently due to the touch of Guenevere on his arm.

The opening of the story features an accurate description of the area of Boulder Ridge in Auburn, California where Smith lived most of his early life.

Reception
Reviewing Genius Loci and Other Tales in the 1983 book The Guide to Supernatural Fiction, E. F. Bleiler recommended the "best stories are "The Ninth Skeleton", "The Phantoms of the Fire", which is well-handled if trite in theme, and "The Charnel God"."

References
  Definitive version.

Footnotes

External links
 Text of "The Ninth Skeleton"
Publication history at The Eldritch Dark

Short stories by Clark Ashton Smith
The Ninth Skeleton
1928 short stories
Fantasy short stories
Horror short stories
The Ninth Skeleton
Works originally published in Weird Tales